Sioux Trail may refer to:

 Sioux Trail Township, Divide County, North Dakota
 Cut Foot Sioux Trail, a hiking trail in Minnesota
 Sioux-Hustler Trail, another hiking trail in Minnesota
 Sioux Trail elementary school in Burnsville, Minnesota
 Great Sioux Trail, a juvenile historical fiction book by Joseph Alexander Altsheler